General Francis Augustus Eliott, 2nd Baron Heathfield (31 December 1750 – 26 January 1813) was a senior British Army officer.

Military career
Heathfield was a soldier who served as lieutenant-colonel of the 6th (Inniskilling) Dragoons. He largely demolished Nutwell, the family home, and built in its place a neo-classical house faced with tiles imitating Portland stone, an undertaking which he completed c.1800.

He was colonel of the 1st King's Dragoon Guards from 1810 until his death in 1813 and served as a lord of the bedchamber under George IV from 1812 until his death. He did not marry, had no children and the barony became extinct when he died.

References

Sources
Gray, Todd & Rowe, Margery (Eds.), Travels in Georgian Devon: The Illustrated Journals of The Reverend John Swete, 1789–1800, 4 vols., Tiverton, 1999

|-

British Army generals
2
1750 births
1813 deaths